Burmese pagodas are stupas that typically house Buddhist relics, including relics associated with Buddha. Pagodas feature prominently in Myanmar's landscape, earning the country the moniker "land of pagodas." According to 2016 statistics compiled by the State Sangha Maha Nayaka Committee, Myanmar is home to 1,479 pagodas exceeding  in height, a quarter of which are located in Sagaing Region. Several cities in the country, including Mandalay and Bagan, are known for their abundance of pagodas. Pagodas are the site of seasonal pagoda festivals.

Burmese pagodas are enclosed in a compound known as the aran (အာရာမ်, from Pali ārāma), with gateways called mok (မုခ်, from Pali mukha) at the four cardinal directions. The platform surrounding a Burmese pagoda is called a yinbyin (ရင်ပြင်).

Terms 

In the Burmese language, pagodas are known by a number of various terms. The umbrella term phaya (pronounced ), which derives from Sanskrit vara, refers to pagodas, images of the Buddha, as well as royal and religious personages, including the Buddha, kings, and monks. Zedi (စေတီ), which derives from Pali cetiya, specifically refers to typically solid, bell-shaped stupas that may house relics. Pahto (ပုထိုး) refers to hollow square or rectangular buildings built to resemble caves, with chambers that house images of the Buddha. Burmese pagodas are distinguished from kyaungs in that the latter are monasteries that house Buddhist monks.

Types 
Burmese zedis are classified into four prevalent types:
 Datu zedi (ဓာတုစေတီ, from Pali dhātucetiya) or datdaw zedi (ဓာတ်တော်စေတီ) - zedis enshrining relics of the Buddha or arhats
 Paribawga zedi (ပရိဘောဂစေတီ, from Pali paribhogacetiya) - zedis enshrining garments and other items (alms bowls, robes, etc.) that belonged to the Buddha or sacred personages
 Dhamma zedi (ဓမ္မစေတီ, from Pali dhammacetiya) - zedis enshrining sacred texts and manuscripts, along with jewels and precious metals
 Odeiktha zedi (ဥဒ္ဒိဿစေတီ, from Pali uddissacetiya) - zedis built from motives of piety, containing statues of the Buddha, models of sacred images
Of the four classes, dhammazedis and udeikthazedis are the most prevalent, since they are routinely erected by donors as a work of merit. Burmese zedis are typically constructed with bricks, covered with whitewashed stucco. Prominent zedis are gilded with gold. Burmese zedis are crowned with a spired final ornament known as the hti, which is hoisted in a traditional ceremony (ထီးတော်တင်ပွဲ, htidaw tin pwe) that dates to the pre-colonial era.

See also 

Buddhism in Burma
Cetiya
Awgatha
Pagoda festival
Dhamma Talaka Pagoda, Birmingham UK
Global Vipassana Pagoda, Mumbai India
Golden Pagoda, Arunachal Pradesh India 
Sand pagoda
Stupas in Sri Lanka
Relics associated with Buddha

References

External links

Myanmar Pagoda Image from Yahoo
Burmese Pagoda from Google

 
Buddhist buildings